The 9th Parliament of the Republic of Kenya was opened by elected President Mwai Kibaki on February 18, 2003. It was the first time that the formerly-dominant Kenya African National Union of Daniel arap Moi was in the minority. The triumphant NARC (a coalition of the National Alliance Party of Kenya and Liberal Democratic Party), which dominated in the general elections of 2002 was in the majority, led by Kibaki.

However, after the 2005 constitutional referendum, Kibaki threw out the LDP members from his Cabinet, at which point the LDP left NARC and formed the Orange Democratic Movement-Kenya in coalition with Uhuru Kenyatta's KANU party. In 2007, KANU left the coalition and mostly joined with Kibaki's new Party of National Unity, although some of its members stayed with the ODM-Kenya. The original NARC, now headed by Charity Ngilu, allied itself with the ODM-Kenya, which also split into two parties, one ODM led by Raila Odinga and the other ODM-Kenya by Kalonzo Musyoka. The major contestants for the presidential elections were Mwai Kibaki of the PNU coalition, Raila Odinga of ODM and Kalonzo Musyoka of ODM-Kenya.

Composition

The 9th Parliament was composed of the following members from these political parties below:
NARC had 125, of whom 64 would later align themselves with PNU, whilst the 61 who did  not (many of whom were elected as LDP MPs), would later align themselves with either ODM or ODM-Kenya. Ford-People had  14 elected legislators, with Safina, FORD-Asili, Sisi Kwa Sisi getting 2 members each. Finally the Shirikisho Party of Kenya had one member bringing the total to 209 members of Parliament.

Performance

Many Kenyans had a lot of expectations of changes to be effected by this parliament. In the inaugural speech President Mwai Kibaki, said that the 9th parliament heralded Kenya's long-awaited second liberation and promised their total commitment to tackle and eliminate corruption and ensure good governance.

The 9th Parliament has come under scrutiny and have been criticized for many failings.
According to a report from Mars Group Kenya  which is a type of watch dog to create awareness and accountability from Kenya's leadership, this parliament started by increasing their own remuneration and other allowances to become the most expensive parliament in the history of Kenya with an annual budget of over USD$57 million.

This parliament also failed to show leadership in the follow-up of the November 2005 Referendum on the Draft Constitution. They will go in history as the only parliament that never made any constitutional input in their 5 years tenure. A Constitution of Kenya Amendment Bill introduced in August 2007 by the Ministry of Justice and Constitutional Affairs Martha Karua didn't garner the necessary votes due to issues of women representation. This parliament also failed to look onto the issue of boundary review which had been recommended by the Electoral Commission of Kenya (ECK) to increase the representation with at least 40 new constituencies.

In 2007 they introduced a media bill which was looked upon as attempts to gag the media. They also attempted to reduce the powers of the Kenya Anti Corruption Commission (KACC). Their poor record of attendance was evident in the number of statutes that they were able to pass during their term. They passed 67 bills about 13 bills a year, a dismal record in comparison with what other parliaments achieve like the South African parliament which passes over 40 statutes a year. They were many issues pertaining to poor management of resources and funds under their control through the newly introduced CDF and failure in taking decisive action against illegal charges on the Consolidated Fund which involved fraudulent payments to phantom projects not undertaken like the Anglo Leasing and the Ken Ren Fertilizer project.

However the 9th parliament passed some relevant and good bills such as the establishment of Constituency Development Fund (CDF) and its increment in funding, Sexual offences bill moved by Njoki Ndungu, privatization authority, the insurance regulatory authority, and number of funding and regulating authorities just to mention a few.

The 9th Parliament was dissolved on October 22, 2007  in order to prepare for the parliamentary and presidential elections that year. It was succeeded by the 10th Kenyan Parliament in January 2008.

References

See also 

 Politics of Kenya
 Elections in Kenya
 List of political parties in Kenya

Kenyan parliaments
2003 establishments in Kenya
2007 disestablishments in Kenya